Teräväinen or Teravainen, a surname of Finnish origin, can refer to:

 Jeff Teravainen, Canadian actor
 Kari Teräväinen, Finnish professional ice hockey player, who played for several teams, e.g. HPK and Vaasan Sport
 Peter Teravainen - American professional golfer who most recently played in the European Seniors Tour
 Teuvo Teräväinen - Finnish professional ice hockey player, currently playing for the Carolina Hurricanes of the National Hockey League.